The first cattle dip is a provincial heritage site in Richmond in the KwaZulu-Natal province of South Africa.

In 1994 it was described in the Government Gazette as

References
 South African Heritage Resource Agency database

Buildings and structures in KwaZulu-Natal
Plunge dips